Laurent Depoitre (born 7 December 1988) is a Belgian professional footballer who plays as a forward for Gent. He has made one senior appearance for the Belgium national team.

Club career

Eendracht Aalst
When a large number of players had to leave Péruwelz after the 2008–09 season, Eendracht Aalst took advantage of the situation in the summer of 2009 and signed Depoitre alongside Damien Galucci and Olivier De Castro. Depoitre formed a good pair in Alost with Wouter Moreels, and he was chosen as the best player of the team after his first season. 2011, the team became champion in Third Division A. In the 2011–12 season Depoitre was followed by, among other clubs, AA Gent, Lierse SK, Oud-Heverlee Leuven, Beerschot AC, N.E.C., Heerenveen, Willem II and Roda JC.

Oostende
In 2012, Depoitre joined Oostende from Aalst.

In January 2013, it was announced that he would be transferred to Zulte Waregem in 2013–14. Afterwards, his transfer turned out to be a part of a share transaction between Yves Lejaeghere, the then-president of Ostend, and Patrick Decuyper, the then-general manager of Zulte Waregem. In the end the transaction was cancelled and as a result the transfer was also revoked.

Gent
After Depoitre decided not to extend his contract with Oostende, it was announced that he would play for KAA Gent during the 2014–2015 season.

Porto
On 8 August 2016, Depoitre signed for Portuguese club Porto for four seasons, with €40 million release fee. Porto paid a €6 million transfer fee to Gent. He finished the season with 13 appearances across all competitions scoring two goals and providing one assist.

Huddersfield Town
On 23 June 2017, it was confirmed that Depoitre had signed a two-year contract with Premier League newcomers Huddersfield Town, for an undisclosed fee, and a record transfer fee for the club. However, his transfer fee record would go on to be overtaken later that transfer window, by Aaron Mooy moving from Manchester City for £8 million.

He was released by Huddersfield at the end of the 2018–19 season, having scored six times in sixty appearances for the club, including the second goal in Huddersfield's win of Manchester United and the goal v Chelsea at Stamford Bridge to secure a draw against the then-champions and with it the point that kept Huddersfield in the Premier League for a second season.

Return to Gent
On 23 July 2019, Depoitre returned to Belgium, signing for his former club Gent on a three-year contract.

International career
On 10 October 2015, he made his senior debut for the national team in a 4–1 win in a UEFA Euro 2016 qualification match against Andorra. Depoitre scored his team's fourth goal.

Career statistics

Club

International

Statistics accurate as of last match played on 10 October 2015.

Scores and results list Belgium's goal tally first.

Honours
Aalst
 Belgian Third Division: 2010–11

Oostende
 Belgian Second Division: 2012–13

Gent
 Belgian Pro League: 2014–15
 Belgian Cup: 2021–22
 Belgian Super Cup: 2015

Individual
 Jean-Claude Bouvy Trophy: 2015

References

External links

Living people
1988 births
Sportspeople from Tournai
Footballers from Hainaut (province)
Belgian footballers
Belgium international footballers
Association football forwards
R.F.C. Tournai players
R.R.C. Peruwelz players
S.C. Eendracht Aalst players
K.V. Oostende players
K.A.A. Gent players
FC Porto players
Huddersfield Town A.F.C. players
Belgian Pro League players
Challenger Pro League players
Primeira Liga players
Belgian expatriate footballers
Belgian expatriate sportspeople in England
Belgian expatriate sportspeople in Portugal
Expatriate footballers in Portugal
Expatriate footballers in England
Premier League players